Batyrevo (Patăryel) is a rural locality (a selo) and the administrative center of Batyrevsky District of the Chuvash Republic, Russia. Population:

References

Notes

Sources

Rural localities in Chuvashia
Populated places established in 1570
Buinsky Uyezd